William Benjamin Reed (27 February 1833 – 16 October 1909) was a one term Democratic mayor of South Norwalk, Connecticut from 1891 to 1892. He served on the South Norwalk City Council from 1878 to 1879.

He was the son of Benjamin Pearce Reed of New York City and Eliza Weed of New Canaan. He was the third great-grandson of John Read, who settled in Norwalk in 1687. Reed attended the common schools, and at 18, he became an oysterman. It became his life's work. He was a partner in Reed and Housmen, oyster growers and shippers.

Associations 
 Member, Masons
 Member, Norwalk Yacht Club

References 

1833 births
1909 deaths
American Freemasons
Baptists from Connecticut
Connecticut city council members
Connecticut Democrats
Mayors of Norwalk, Connecticut
Oysters
19th-century American politicians
19th-century Baptists